Haeundae Tourist High School is a private vocational high school in U-dong, Haeundae District, Busan, South Korea.

History 
 December 1972: Accreditation of Haeundae Girls' Commercial High School 
 November 1975: Renamed Dong-nyong Educational Institution
 March 2001: Renamed Haeundae Tourism High School 
 June 2002: Completion of the practical tourism center (Korea Food and Cooking Room, Korean food and bakery lab, food and beverage lab, casino lab, multilingual dance room, and golf course)

Major
 Department of Tourism 
 Department of Tourism and Cooking
 Department of Leisuridae
 Department of Tourism Management

References

Schools in Busan
Haeundae District